Benjamin Emmet Nye, Sr. (January 12, 1907 – February 9, 1986) was an American makeup artist for the Hollywood film industry for over four decades, from the 1930s to the early 1980s. He worked on over five hundred 20th Century Fox films both in and out of Hollywood. Including Gone with the Wind (1939), Miracle on 34th Street (1947), Gentlemen Prefer Blondes (1953), The King and I (1956), The Fly (1958), Valley of the Dolls (1967), and Planet of the Apes (1968).

Retirement and death
Nye officially retired in 1967 and created the Ben Nye Makeup Company. Nye, Sr. left his son Dana in charge of the company as CEO.  Nye's son, Ben, Jr., also works in the film makeup industry.

Nye died on February 9, 1986, in Santa Monica, California, at the age of 79.

References

External links

MakeUpMania.com interview with son Dana Nye
Ben Nye Makeup Company

1907 births
1986 deaths
20th-century American businesspeople
American cosmetics businesspeople
American make-up artists
Businesspeople from Nebraska
People from Fremont, Nebraska